Giada Pamela De Laurentiis (born August 22, 1970) is an Italian-American chef, writer, and television personality. She was the host of Food Network's Giada at Home. She also appears regularly as a contributor and guest co-host on NBC's Today. De Laurentiis is the founder of the catering business GDL Foods. She is a winner of the Daytime Emmy Award for Outstanding Lifestyle Host and the Gracie Award for Best Television Host. She was also recognized by the International Hospitality Institute as one of the Global 100 in Hospitality, a list featuring the 100 Most Powerful People in Global Hospitality.

Early life 

Giada Pamela De Benedetti was born on August 22, 1970, in Rome, Italy, the eldest child of actress Veronica De Laurentiis and her first husband, actor-producer Alex De Benedetti. De Benedetti was a close associate of Giada's maternal grandfather, film producer Dino De Laurentiis. As a child, Giada often found herself in the family's kitchen and spent a great deal of time at her grandfather's restaurant, DDL Foodshow. Her parents were married in February 1970 but were later divorced. After her parents' divorce, Giada and her siblings moved to Southern California, where they took their mother's surname. After graduating from Marymount High School in Los Angeles, De Laurentiis attended the University of California, Los Angeles, earning her bachelor's degree in social anthropology in 1996.

Her maternal great-grandmother was English and her grandmother was British-Italian film star Silvana Mangano. Her paternal grandmother, Pamela De Benedetti née Leslie-Jones (1923–1998), was also English. Her siblings include sister Eloisa, a makeup artist, and brothers Igor and Dino Alexander II, a Hollywood film editor who died of melanoma in 2003. Her stepfather is producer Ivan Kavalsky.

Career 
De Laurentiis studied at Le Cordon Bleu in Paris, with aspirations of becoming a pastry chef. After returning to the United States, she became a professional chef working in several Los Angeles restaurants, notably the Wolfgang Puck-owned Spago. She later worked as a food stylist and was contacted by the Food Network after styling a piece in Food & Wine magazine in 2002.

Her daytime cooking show on the Food Network, Everyday Italian, premiered April 5, 2003. On Chefography, a Food Network biography program, she said she never wanted to be in her "family business" of show business, and that she felt uncomfortable in front of the camera when she first began hosting Everyday Italian. When the program first aired, the Food Network received mail accusing the network of hiring a model or actress pretending to cook instead of a real chef.

De Laurentiis began hosting Behind the Bash in October 2005. The program examines the catering process behind big event extravaganzas such as the Grammy Awards. In January 2007, a third De Laurentiis-hosted show, Giada's Weekend Getaways, debuted on Food Network. On this show, De Laurentiis travels to a featured locale (including Seattle, South Beach, San Francisco, Napa, and Jackson Hole, Wyoming) and visits her favorite local culinary destinations. On a November 2006 episode of Iron Chef America, De Laurentiis and Bobby Flay competed against, and were defeated by, Rachael Ray and Mario Batali.

In 2007, De Laurentiis appeared as a presenter at the inaugural Food Network Awards. In June 2007, she hosted a two-part Food Network special entitled Giada in Paradise, featuring the two locales of Santorini, Greece and Capri, Italy. De Laurentiis also made several appearances as a guest judge on the third season of The Next Food Network Star, which aired in 2007. That year she was dubbed a "petite powerhouse" by Town & Country magazine, standing "just under five-foot two". In 2008, she won a Daytime Emmy Award for Outstanding Lifestyle Host.

In 2008, De Laurentiis and the Barilla Group, launched an Italian gourmet line under the Academia Barilla name—Barilla's first-ever gourmet celebrity product line. That same year, Giada at Home premiered, showing De Laurentiis in a kitchen preparing meals and parties for family and friends. The show is shot on a set that is very similar to her own home. She joined fellow chef Bobby Flay as a judge in season 7 of Food Network Star and took on a new role in season 8 as a team leader of five cooks competing against Bobby Flay's and Alton Brown's respective teams.

In 2009, De Laurentiis became the voice of "Paulette", a character on the animated children's show Handy Manny. In early 2010, De Laurentiis came out with a line of kitchen supplies, exclusively for Target. That same year, CafeMom ranked her as #6 on their yearly "Sexiest Moms Alive" list. In June 2010, De Laurentiis became a regularly appearing mentor to the finalists on the popular Food Network competition show The Next Food Network Star.

In July 2014, De Laurentiis opened her first restaurant, called GIADA, inside The Cromwell in Las Vegas, Nevada. The restaurant offers seating in the dining room, lounge, or outdoor patio with views of the Bellagio fountains and Caesars Palace. The GIADA menu includes Italian cuisine with Californian influences, including "lemon spaghetti, chicken cacciatore, marsala herb chicken meatballs, rosemary focaccia and lemon flatbread and vegetable Bolognese rigatoni". Family-style, vegan, and gluten-free options are also available, as well as an antipasto station. Restaurant guests can watch chefs prepare food from the open kitchen.

In 2014, De Laurentiis voiced the character of Gelata in the U.S. version of the Tinker Bell special Pixie Hollow Bake Off.

In 2018, De Laurentiis voiced herself in the movie Scooby-Doo! and the Gourmet Ghost.

On June 26, 2020, De Laurentiis' Food Network series Giada Entertains won a Daytime Emmy Award as Outstanding Culinary Series. On July 26, 2020, De Laurentiis won the Daytime Emmy for Outstanding Culinary Host. 

On February 10, 2023, De Laurentiis has signed a multi-year deal to create and produce unscripted programming with Amazon Studios. Later in February, De Laurentiis was named as the godmother for the Oceania Cruises' ship Vista, the first new ship from the cruise line in more than a decade.

Products 
De Laurentiis had a range of products made exclusively for Target. In 2013, ceramic lasagna pans under the Giada De Laurentiis brand were recalled after they cracked and at least six people were injured. In 2022, Target only seems to carry her books, including a Target edition of Eat Better, Feel Better.

Restaurants 
De Laurentiis has two restaurants on the Las Vegas Strip. She opened her first restaurant in May 2014. The restaurant, simply called "Giada", is located in the Cromwell. She opened a second restaurant in early 2018. "Pronto by Giada", taking up residency in Caesars Palace, is a fast casual dining restaurant.

In July 2017, she announced she would also be opening a restaurant in the Horseshoe Casino in Baltimore, Maryland, just north of Washington, D.C. It is called GDL Italian by Giada, and opened in May 2018.

Personal life 

On May 25, 2003, De Laurentiis married Todd Thompson, a fashion designer. The couple's only child, Jade Marie De Laurentiis-Thompson, was born on March 29, 2008. Jade was named after her mother - "Giada" is Italian for "Jade." While acknowledging how special the experience of having a child has been, she has stated that she does not plan to have more children. De Laurentiis remains focused on her career, saying, "I have so many babies: the show, Todd, and Jade." On December 29, 2014, De Laurentiis announced on her website that she and Todd had separated the previous July, and had decided to end their marriage. The divorce was finalized on September 3, 2015. Since November 2015, she has been romantically involved with TV producer Shane Farley.

Publications 

 
 
 
 
 
 
 
 
 
 
 

Both Giada at Home and Weeknights with Giada landed in the number one position on The New York Times Best Seller list.

Awards and nominations

References

External links 

 
 Food Network profile
 

1970 births
Alumni of Le Cordon Bleu
American cookbook writers
American food writers
American people of English descent
American television chefs
Daytime Emmy Award winners
Food Network chefs
Italian emigrants to the United States
Italian people of English descent
Living people
People of Campanian descent
University of California, Los Angeles alumni
American women chefs
Women cookbook writers
Writers from Rome
Giada
American women non-fiction writers
Chefs from California
21st-century American businesswomen
21st-century American businesspeople
21st-century American non-fiction writers
Chefs from Los Angeles